Nazia Tabassum Nazir (born 9 January 1978) is a Pakistani former cricketer who played as an all-rounder, batting right-handed and bowling right-arm medium. She appeared in three Test matches and 30 One Day Internationals for Pakistan between 1997 and 2004. She played domestic cricket for Sialkot.

References

External links
 
 

1978 births
Living people
People from Gujranwala District
Punjabi people
Pakistan women Test cricketers
Pakistan women One Day International cricketers
Sialkot women cricketers